Naina Sahni was the victim of the tandoor murder case. On 2 July 1995, she was killed by her husband Sushil Sharma, a Congress youth leader and Member of the Legislative Assembly  . Naina herself was a worker in the congress  party. Sushil Sharma was convicted for the murder by the Trial Court, Delhi High Court and Supreme Court. On 8 December  2020, Sharma was not found guilty by the High  Court.

Tandoor Murder Case
Sushil Sharma objected to his wife Naina Sahni's friendship with Matloob Karim. Matloob and Naina were classmates and fellow Congress workers. Sushil suspected Naina of having an extramarital relationship with Matloob. On the night of 2 July 1995, Sushil came home and saw Naina talking on the phone and consuming alcohol. Naina, on seeing Sushil, hung up. Sushil redialed the phone to find Matloob on the other end. Enraged, he fatally shot Naina. He took the body to a restaurant called Bagiya and tried to dispose it off with the restaurant manager, Keshav Kumar. The body was put in a tandoor (clay oven) to burn. Police arrested Keshav Kumar but Sharma managed to flee. He surrendered on 10 July 1995. The case also involved the use of DNA evidence to establish the identity of the victim.

The first postmortem was conducted at LHMC Delhi, the cause of death was opined to be burn injuries. The second postmortem was ordered by Lieutenant Governor Delhi, which was conducted by a team of three doctors from three different hospitals headed by T D Dogra. They detected two bullets in head and neck region, opined cause of death due to firearm injuries. With that, the course of investigation changed and the actual story came to light. This case is a landmark citation for fruitful second autopsy.
Delhi Police investigated the case and filed a charge sheet on 27 July 1995 in a Sessions Court. On 7 November 2003, Sushil Sharma was sentenced to death and restaurant manager, Keshav Kumar, was given seven years rigorous imprisonment.

Sharma appealed against District Court Judgement in Delhi High Court trial court judgement. The Delhi High Court upheld the lower courts' decision. In 2003, a city court awarded him death sentence which was later upheld by the Delhi High Court in 2007. In 2013, the SC commuted his death sentence stating that there was "no evidence" of Sharma chopping his wife’s body. On 8 October 2013, a three-judge bench of Chief Justice P. Sathasivam and Justices Ranjana Desai and Ranjan Gogoi of the Supreme Court upheld Sharma's conviction. However, the court commuted his death sentence to life imprisonment because Sharma doesn't have a criminal antecedent and it is not a crime against society, but it is a crime committed by the accused due to a strained personal relationship with his wife.

On 21 December 2018, Delhi High Court ordered immediate release of Sushil Sharma.

References

External links 
 https://web.archive.org/web/20020320090304/http://www.tribuneindia.com/1999/99jan31/edit.htm

1960s births
1995 deaths
1995 in India
Deaths by firearm in India
People murdered in Delhi
Year of birth missing
Violence against women in India
Women in Delhi
Murder in Delhi
1995 murders in India